Guernsey operates a system of government by committees and consensus.  The States of Deliberation is both parliament and executive, but it delegates some of its executive functions to policy-specific committees, which are known as States Departments, each of which is run by five political members, all of whom have equal voting power.

Despite having explicitly rejected a proposal to adopt an executive/ministerial system of government in 2002, the heads of each department were known as ministers.  They were, in effect, presidents or chairmen of their committees.

The Policy Council consisted of the ministers/presidents of each of the ten departments plus the chief minister, who chairs Policy Council and speaks for the island externally in political matters.  The Policy Council's main functions were policy co-ordination and responsibility for external relations.  The chief minister and all department heads are elected by all members of the States of Deliberation.  There also existed the post of Deputy Chief Minister, which was held by one of the department heads and was also elected by all members of the States of Deliberation.

On 1 May 2016 the Policy Council of Guernsey ceased to exist and a new committee, the Policy and Resources Committee was created.

Policy Council (March 2014 – April 2016)

Policy Council (May 2012 – March 2014)

Policy Council (May 2008 – May 2012)

Policy Council (March 2007 – May 2008)

Policy Council (May 2004 – March 2007)

References

See also
 Politics of Guernsey
 Council of Ministers of the Isle of Man
 Council of Ministers of Jersey

Guernsey
Guernsey
Government of Guernsey
2004 establishments in Guernsey
2016 disestablishments in Guernsey